Antonio Franchi (1638–1709) was an Italian painter of the 17th century, active mainly in Florence and Lucca.

Born in Villa Basilica, he is also called Il Lucchese. Initially training in Lucca with Domenico Ferrucci, he moved for over a decade (1655–67) to Florence, to work with Felice Ficherelli and Baldassare Franceschini. He returned to Lucca for seven years, and then moved back to Florence, where he worked for under first Strozzi, then Medici patronage. In 1683 he was admitted to the Accademia dell'Arte del Disegno. He died in Florence. His paintings have the porcelain crispness of design, characteristic of Carlo Dolci; and some the sensuality of a Francesco Furini.

He painted a San Giovanni Gualberto in prayer for the Chapel of the saint in the Vallombrosa Abbey. He painted a Madonna and Bambino for the church of Santa Marta, Montopoli in Val d'Arno.

He also published a text on the practice and materials of painting titled: La Teorica della Pittura. It was dedicated to the Cavaliere Francesco Niccolo Gabburri. It also regales observations on prior and contemporary Italian painters.

References

External links 

  Web gallery of Art | Antonio Franchi

1638 births
1709 deaths
17th-century Italian painters
Italian male painters
18th-century Italian painters
Italian Baroque painters
Italian art historians
Painters from Lucca
18th-century Italian male artists